Profira Sadoveanu (pen name, Valer Donea; May 21, 1906 – September 12, 2003) was a Romanian prose writer and poet.

Biography
Born in Fălticeni, her parents were novelist Mihail Sadoveanu and his wife Ecaterina (née Bâlu). She attended Nicu Gane High School in her native town from 1917 to 1918, a private course prepared by her father and Oltea Doamna High School in Iași, graduating in 1925. She studied at the philosophy section of the literature and philosophy faculty at Iași University from 1925 to 1929, but did not take her graduating examination. She intended to study the dramatic arts in Paris, but did not obtain her father's consent.

Under the pen name "Valer Donea", she published reportages in Universul literar și artistic. Her first novel was Mormolocul (1933), followed by Naufragiații din Aukland (1937). Her fairly extensive output included books of interviews (Domniile lor domnii și doamnele, 1937, republished in 1969 as Stele și luceferi), memoirs and volumes recalling Mihail Sadoveanu (O zi cu Sadoveanu, 1955; Viața lui Mihail Sadoveanu, 1957, republished in 1966 as Ostrovul zimbrului; În umbra stejarului, 1965; Planeta părăsită, 1970), prose poems (Ploi și ninsori, 1940), poems (Somnul pietrei, 1971; Cântecele lui Ștefan Vodă, 1974; Flori de piatră, 1980; Ora violetă, 1984) and children's verses (Balaurul alb, 1955; Ochelarii bunicii, 1969). Strongly influenced by her father's literary style, she adopted his florid descriptions but infused her writing with a purely feminine sensibility. Alone or in collaboration with her stepmother Valeria, she translated Anton Chekhov, Konstantin Ushinsky, Alexander Ostrovsky and Honoré de Balzac, and republished her father's books. She died in Bucharest.

Notes

1906 births
2003 deaths
People from Fălticeni
Romanian children's writers
Romanian women writers
Romanian writers
Romanian women poets
Romanian women children's writers
Romanian memoirists
Romanian journalists
Romanian translators
20th-century Romanian poets
20th-century Romanian novelists
20th-century translators
Children's poets
20th-century journalists
20th-century memoirists
20th-century pseudonymous writers
Pseudonymous women writers